Jacob's Room is the third novel by Virginia Woolf, first published on 26 October 1922.

The novel centres, in a very ambiguous way, around the life story of the protagonist Jacob Flanders and is presented almost entirely through the impressions other characters have of Jacob. Thus, although it could be said that the book is primarily a character study and has little in the way of plot or background, the narrative is constructed with a void in place of the central character if, indeed, the novel can be said to have a 'protagonist' in conventional terms.

Motifs of emptiness and absence haunt the novel and establish its elegiac feel. Jacob is described to us, but in such indirect terms that it would seem better to view him as an amalgam of the different perceptions of the characters and narrator. He does not exist as a concrete reality, but rather as a collection of memories and sensations.

Plot summary
Set in pre-war England, the novel begins in Jacob's childhood and follows him through college at Cambridge and into adulthood. The story is told mainly through the perspectives of the women in Jacob's life, including the repressed upper-middle-class Clara Durrant and the uninhibited young art student Florinda, with whom he has an affair. His time in London forms a large part of the story, though towards the end of the novel he travels to Italy and then Greece.

Literary significance
The novel is a departure from Woolf's earlier two novels, The Voyage Out (1915) and Night and Day (1919), which are more conventional in form and narration. The work is seen as an important modernist text; its experimental form is viewed as a progression of the innovative writing style Woolf presented in her earlier collection of short fiction titled Monday or Tuesday (1919).

Further reading
 Ane Martine Lönneker: "What Can This Sorrow Be?" Elegiac Affectivity in Virginia Woolf's ′Jacob's Room′, in: Structures of Feeling. Affectivity and the Study of Culture, edited by Devika Sharma and Frederik Tygstrup, de Gruyter, 2015, p. 169–177,

External links

 
 
 
 
 Review from The Guardian

1922 British novels
Novels by Virginia Woolf
Novels set in University of Cambridge
Hogarth Press books